Let's Dance is a German dance competition television series that premiered on April 3, 2006, on RTL and filmed live in Cologne. The show is based on the British BBC Television series Strictly Come Dancing and is part of BBC Worldwide's Dancing with the Stars franchise.

The format of the show consists of a celebrity paired with a professional dancer. Each couple performs predetermined dances and competes against the others for judges' points and audience votes. The couple receiving the lowest combined total of judges' points and audience votes is eliminated each week until only the champion dance pair remains.

Format
Celebrities dance in the programs with a professional or successful tournament dancer in several dances. At the end of each performance, each jury member gives a score between one and ten. Which couples on the next Let's Dance show will participate and which not, will be determined by the jury rating and the audience, who can vote for their favorites by telephone at the end of the program. The last placed in the jury evaluation receives one point, the penultimate two points and so on. The same applies to the placements of the audience rating. (The organizer does not publish the results of the audience rating (number of callers or ranking list).) The highest placed person receives as many points as there are still couples in the race in the respective episode. Jury and spectator ratings are added together, the pair with the fewest points is eliminated. If there are several last-placed couples with the same rating, the couple with the lowest audience rating will be eliminated.

Cast

Hosts
Nazan Eckes has been the host for seasons one to three. In season one and two, her co-host was Hape Kerkeling and in season three Daniel Hartwich. Between season four and ten Hartwich has been presenting alongside Sylvie Meis. The program is currently hosted by Hartwich and Austrian singer and former winner Victoria Swarovski. Daniel Hartwich was replaced by Oliver Geissen in the first regular show of season 11 and by Jan Köppen in fifth regular show and the final of season 15.

Colour key

Judging panel
The judges in season one were Michael Hull, Markus Schöffl, Katarina Witt and Joachim Llambi. In season two Ute Lemper replaced Katarina Witt. The judges in season three were Harald Glööckler, Peter Kraus, Isabel Edvardsson and Joachim Llambi. In season four Roman Frieling replaced Peter Kraus and Motsi Mabuse replaced Isabel Edvardsson. In season five Maite Kelly replaced Harald Glööckler. From season six onwards, the judges are Jorge González, Motsi Mabuse and Joachim Llambi. Dieter Bohlen filled in for Ute Lemper for the season 2 final. Joachim Llambi was replaced by Rúrik Gíslason in the season 15 opening show.

Colour key

Professional dancers
Color key:
 Winner of the season
 Runner-up of the season
 Third place of the season
 Last place of the season
 Withdrew or quit in the season
 Still participating in the current season
Bold denotes a current professional dancer.

Series overview

Dances

Records

Highest-scoring celebrities
The scores presented below represent the best overall accumulative average scores the celebrity gained each season. Points have been adjusted because some seasons had 30 points and others 40 points.

Lowest-scoring celebrities
The scores presented below represent the worst overall accumulative average scores the celebrity gained each season.

 indicates the winning contestant in his/her season.
 indicates the runner-up contestant in his/her season.
 indicates the third place contestant in his/her season.
 indicates the contestant eliminated first in his/her season.

Perfect scores 
This is a list of celebrities who earned perfect scores.

Professionals with perfect scores

Professionals with at least one participation in the final

Professionals with at least one win

Specials 
Only standalone programs or formats are listed as specials, and not those that are part of another program.

Christmas Specials

Let's Dance – Let's Christmas

The show celebrated a special called Let's Dance – Let's Christmas with 5 celebrities from the past seasons on December 20, 2013, and on December 21, 2013. It was hosted by Daniel Hartwich & Sylvie Meis and the judging panel consisted of Jorge González, Motsi Mabuse and Joachim Llambi. With the prize money of 10,000 euros, Magdalena Brzeska, as the winner of the show, supported blind children in Togo in her function as project sponsor of RTL – Wir helfen Kindern.

Let's Dance – Die große Weihnachtsshow
On December 23, 2022, the special Let's Dance – Die große Weihnachtsshow (The big Christmas show) was broadcast. The jury consisted of Jorge González, Motsi Mabuse and Joachim Llambi. Up to 60 points per couple were awarded. Hosts were Victoria Swarovski and Daniel Hartwich. Participants were the winners of 2020 Lili Paul-Roncalli & Massimo Sinató, the winners of 2022 René Casselly & Kathrin Menzinger, the runners-up of 2022 Janin Ullmann & Zsolt Sándor Cseke, the third-place couple of 2022 Mathias Mester & Renata Lusin, and the winner of 2021 Rúrik Gíslason, who danced with Malika Dzumaev this time instead of Renata Lusin. All five couples presented two dances each. Although the show was taped on June 4, 2022, TV viewers were still able to vote live for their favorites as all five possible winning scenarios were pre-taped. The winners were Rúrik & Malika, who donated the prize money of 10,000 euros to the SOS Children's Villages in Africa.

 indicates the winning couple.

Let's Dance – Stepping Out

Let's Dance – Stepping Out was a spin-off of Let's Dance that aired on RTL in fall 2015. It was hosted by Daniel Hartwich & Sylvie Meis and the judging panel consisted of Jorge González, Motsi Mabuse and Joachim Llambi.

Unlike the original dance show, the contestants were all couples in real life, not one celebrity plus one professional dancer.

Let's Dance – Die große Profi-Challenge
 indicates the winning couple.
 indicates the runner-up couple.
 indicates the third-place couple.

2019
On the show Let's Dance – Die große Profi-Challenge (The big professional challenge), only the professionals competed for the first time on June 27, 2019. The judges were Jorge González, Motsi Mabuse and Joachim Llambi, they commented but gave no points. The hosts were Daniel Hartwich and Victoria Swarovski. The show was pre-recorded on June 19, 2019. Because of that, a voting of the studio audience decided on the winners.

The solo dancers and some of the couples had other dancers on the floor. The professional challenge was won by Ekaterina Leonova & Massimo Sinató, Kathrin Menzinger & Vadim Garbuzov came second and Renata Lusin & Valentin Lusin came third. The winners were promised that one of them will be allowed to choose his or her own prominent dance partner at Let's Dance 2020.

Running order

2020
In 2020, there was also a professional challenge, which was broadcast live on May 29, 2020. Due to the COVID-19 pandemic, this time it took place without a studio audience. Since then there has been a phone voting of the viewers at home to decide on the winners. The judges were again Jorge González, Motsi Mabuse and Joachim Llambi, they commented but gave no points. The hosts were again Daniel Hartwich and Victoria Swarovski.

Christina Luft & Christian Polanc won the second professional challenge and Isabel Edvardsson & Marcus Weiß were runners-up. As in the previous year, Renata Lusin & Valentin Lusin took third place. For Let's Dance 2021, one of the two winners will be allowed to choose his or her own partner among the celebrities.

Running order

2021
In 2021, there was a professional challenge as well, which was broadcast live on June 4, 2021. The judges were again Jorge González, Motsi Mabuse and Joachim Llambi, they commented but gave no points. The hosts were again Daniel Hartwich and Victoria Swarovski. Due to a COVID-19 infection or COVID-19 contact, three originally planned couples, Alona Uehlin & Anton Skuratov, Malika Dzumaev & Zsolt Sándor Cseke and Regina Luca & Sergiu Luca, could not take part in the competition.

Renata Lusin & Valentin Lusin won the third professional challenge. As in the first professional challenge in 2019, Kathrin Menzinger & Vadim Garbuzov came second. As in season 13, Christina Luft & Luca Hänni took third place. For Let's Dance 2022, one of the two winners will be allowed to choose his or her own partner among the celebrities.

Running order

2022
In 2022, there was another professional challenge, which was broadcast live on May 27, 2022. The judges were again Jorge González, Motsi Mabuse and Joachim Llambi, they commented but gave no points. The hosts were again Daniel Hartwich and Victoria Swarovski. For the first time, the professionals weren't allowed to choose their dance partners themselves, but rather the producers of the show put the couples together.

Renata Lusin & Christian Polanc won the fourth professional challenge. It was the second win in a professional challenge for both of them. Kathrin Menzinger & Evgeny Vinokurov came second and Massimo Sinató & Vadim Garbuzov took third place. For Let's Dance 2023, one of the two winners will be allowed to choose his or her own partner among the celebrities.

Running order

Let's Dance – Llambis Tanzduell
In 2019 and 2020, RTL broadcast the spin-off show Let's Dance – Llambis Tanzduell (Llambi's dance duel). In each episode, Let's Dance judge Joachim Llambi sends two professional dancers or celebrities abroad, where they learn unknown local dances. They are supported by local dance trainers. Afterwards, both of them present their skills in front of spectators in national costume together with a local dance group and also solo. Back in Germany, the professional dancers meet Llambi again and review their experiences with the images. At the end of the dance, the local dance trainers and Llambi give it a grade between 1 and 10. The sum of both points awarded determines the winner of the duel.

The results of the duels were as follows:

Let's Dance – Kids

In March 2021, RTL announced that it would broadcast Let's Dance – Kids on its own streaming platform TVNOW from April 9, 2021, for four episodes. As in the original version, Daniel Hartwich and Victoria Swarovski were the presenters. Also formed Joachim Llambi, Motsi Mabuse and Jorge Gonzalez the jury.

The show is based on the American version Dancing with the Stars: Juniors.

Let's Dance – Die Live-Tour

2019
Let's Dance – Die Live-Tour (The Live Tour) is a nationwide arena tour in Germany. Let's Dance went on tour in autumn 2019 for the first time. It was directed by former contestant Thomas Hermanns. The judges were Jorge González, Motsi Mabuse and Joachim Llambi, they judged and gave points but only the audience in the arena decided on the winning couple every evening. The host was Daniel Hartwich. The group dances were choreographed by Massimo Sinató and Victoria Kleinfelder-Cibis. The aerialist was Sergey Mishchurenko. The tour began on 8 November in Riesa and finished on 29 November in Munich. In total there were 16 cities and 17 shows. 125,000 tickets were sold.

Participating couples and their dances were:

Other participating professionals were:
Andrzej Cibis
Dimitri Boog
Kathrin Menzinger
Katja Kalugina
Marta Arndt
Robert Beitsch
Vadim Garbuzov
Victoria Kleinfelder-Cibis

The results of the tour were as follows:

Annotation
 1 On these dates, Oana Nechiti stood in for Motsi Mabuse, who was unable to be present due to her work as a judge on Strictly Come Dancing.

2021
Let's Dance went on tour in autumn 2021 for the second time. It was directed by choreographer Gerald van Windt. The judges were Jorge González, Motsi Mabuse and Joachim Llambi again, they judged and gave points but only the audience in the arena decided on the winning couple every evening. The host was Daniel Hartwich. The group dances were choreographed by Vadim Garbuzov and Kathrin Menzinger. The aerialist was Keeva Treanor. The tour began on 2 November in Riesa and finished on 28 November in Düsseldorf. In total there were 14 cities and 19 shows. 135,000 tickets were sold.

Participating couples and their dances were:

Other participating professionals were:
Alexandru Ionel
Evgeny Vinokurov
Jesse Wijnans
Marta Arndt
Regina Luca
Victoria Kleinfelder-Cibis
Zsolt Sándor Cseke

The results of the tour were as follows:

Annotation
 2 On these dates, Isabel Edvardsson stood in for Motsi Mabuse, who was unable to be present due to her work as a judge on Strictly Come Dancing.

2022
Let's Dance went on tour in autumn 2022 for the third time. It was directed by choreographer Gerald van Windt. The judges were Jorge González, Motsi Mabuse and Joachim Llambi again, they judged and gave points but only the audience in the arena decided on the winning couple every evening. The host was Daniel Hartwich. The group dances were choreographed by Vadim Garbuzov and Kathrin Menzinger. The aerialists were Sergey Mishchurenko and Olga Ignatenko. The tour began on 31 October in Riesa and finished on 27 November in Düsseldorf. In total there were 16 cities and 22 shows.

Participating couples and their dances were:

Other participating professionals were:
Alexandru Ionel
Andrzej Cibis
Dimitar Stefanin
Evgeny Vinokurov
Jesse Wijnans
Marta Arndt
Patricija Ionel
Regina Luca
Valentin Lusin

The results of the tour were as follows:

Annotation
 3 On these dates, Isabel Edvardsson stood in for Motsi Mabuse, who was unable to be present due to her work as a judge on Strictly Come Dancing.

References

External links

Official website

 
German music television series
German reality television series
2006 German television series debuts
2010s German television series
2020s German television series
German-language television shows
RTL (German TV channel) original programming
German television series based on British television series